The Michigan Soo Indians, also known as the American Soo Indians, was a professional ice hockey team from Sault Ste. Marie, Michigan, United States. The team played for three seasons in the International Professional Hockey League, the first fully professional hockey league in North America, from 1904 to 1907. The league was formed in November 1904 and consisted of five teams; three from Michigan, one from Pennsylvania and one from Ontario in Canada.

Michigan Soo Indians had its best season in the IPHL in its second year, the 1905–06 season, when the team finished at second place in the standings with 36 points, two points behind the champion team Portage Lakes Hockey Club.

Notable players
Notable players who played for the Michigan Soo Indians were Hockey Hall of Fame members Didier Pitre and Jack Laviolette.

References
"The International Hockey League and the Professionalization of Ice Hockey, 1904-1907" Daniel S. Mason, 1998, Journal of Sport History 25 (1): 1–17.

Notes

Defunct ice hockey teams in the United States
Professional ice hockey teams in Michigan